Inday Will Always Love You (International title: Happy Together) is a 2018 Philippine romantic comedy series starring Barbie Forteza, Derrick Monasterio and Juancho Trivino. The series premiered on GMA Network's GMA Telebabad evening block and worldwide via GMA Pinoy TV on May 21, 2018, replacing The One That Got Away.

As of October 5, 2018, 100 episodes of Inday Will Always Love You were aired over two seasons.

NUTAM (Nationwide Urban Television Audience Measurement) People in Television Homes ratings are provided by AGB Nielsen Philippines.

Series overview
<onlyinclude>

Episodes

Season 1 (2018)

May 2018

June 2018

July 2018

August 2018

Season 2 (2018)

August 2018

September 2018

October 2018

References

Lists of Philippine drama television series episodes